Bridgeport is an unincorporated community and census-designated place (CDP) in Mono County, California, United States. It is the Mono county seat. The population was 553 at the 2020 census.

The first post office at Bridgeport opened in 1864. The ZIP code is 93517, and the community is in area codes 760 and 442.

Geography

The town center is located at the intersection of U.S. Route 395 and State Route 182. US 395 leads south  to Mammoth Lakes and northwest  to Carson City, Nevada, while State Route 182 leads northeast  to the Nevada border.

Bridgeport Reservoir, an impoundment on the East Walker River, forms the northwest edge of the community.

Demographics
The 2010 United States Census reported that Bridgeport had a population of 575. The racial makeup of Bridgeport was 484 (84.2%) White, 1 (0.2%) African American, 43 (7.5%) Native American, 1 (0.2%) Asian, 0 (0.0%) Pacific Islander, 25 (4.3%) from other races, and 21 (3.7%) from two or more races. Hispanic or Latino of any race were 148 persons (25.7%).

The Census reported that 559 people (97.2% of the population) lived in households, 0 (0%) lived in non-institutionalized group quarters, and 16 (2.8%) were institutionalized.

There were 257 households, out of which 67 (26.1%) had children under the age of 18 living in them, 124 (48.2%) were opposite-sex married couples living together, 22 (8.6%) had a female householder with no husband present, 9 (3.5%) had a male householder with no wife present.  There were 12 (4.7%) unmarried opposite-sex partnerships, and 1 (0.4%) same-sex married couples or partnerships. 88 households (34.2%) were made up of individuals, and 26 (10.1%) had someone living alone who was 65 years of age or older. The average household size was 2.18.  There were 155 families (60.3% of all households); the average family size was 2.83.

The population was spread out, with 119 people (20.7%) under the age of 18, 46 people (8.0%) aged 18 to 24, 118 people (20.5%) aged 25 to 44, 193 people (33.6%) aged 45 to 64, and 99 people (17.2%) who were 65 years of age or older.  The median age was 45.5 years. For every 100 females, there were 103.2 males.  For every 100 females age 18 and over, there were 104.5 males.

There were 357 housing units at an average density of 16.4 per square mile (6.3/km2), of which 160 (62.3%) were owner-occupied, and 97 (37.7%) were occupied by renters. The homeowner vacancy rate was 5.3%; the rental vacancy rate was 19.0%.  341 people (59.3% of the population) lived in owner-occupied housing units and 218 people (37.9%) lived in rental housing units.

Tourism
Formerly known as Big Meadows, Bridgeport is annually visited by thousands of tourists, many of whom come to the area for its well-known trout streams and lakes.  Bridgeport Reservoir, Twin Lakes, Virginia Lakes, Green Creek, the East Walker River, the West Walker River and numerous small tributaries and backcountry lakes offer rainbow, brown and cutthroat trout fishing. The Bridgeport Fish Enhancement Program sponsors fishing tournaments twice per season. Bridgeport also occasionally plays host to the annual E Clampus Vitus celebration.

Bridgeport is known for its backcountry winter recreation.  Over 500 miles of cross-country skiing, snowshoeing, dogsledding, snowmobiling and multiple-use trails are found around the town, including Virginia Lakes Road, the Sweetwater Range, Buckeye, Bodie Hills and Summers Meadows.  Many backcountry bowls can be used for telemarking and cross-country downhilling. Bridgeport is also notable for its proximity to the well-preserved ghost town of Bodie. The Mono County Courthouse is listed on the National Register of Historic Places.

Climate
Bridgeport experiences a continental climate (Dsb) and featuring cold, relatively snowy winters and dry summers with very warm days and cold mornings.

The record low temperature of  occurred on January 31, 1937. There are an average of 40.4 days with measurable precipitation.

The most precipitation in one month was  during January 2017.

Politics

State

Federal

Native Americans
Bridgeport is the tribal headquarters for the Bridgeport Paiute Indian Colony of California.

Education
Bridgeport is in the Eastern Sierra Unified School District, which has its main office in town. An elementary school and a high school (Eastern Sierra Academy) are located in Bridgeport. Bridgeport also has a public library.

References

External links

 Bridgeport Chamber of Commerce

Census-designated places in Mono County, California
County seats in California
Hot springs of California
Populated places in the Sierra Nevada (United States)
Populated places established in 1864
1864 establishments in California
Hot springs of Mono County, California